Trokadero is a 1981 West German-Austrian drama film directed by Klaus Emmerich. It was entered into the 12th Moscow International Film Festival.

Cast
 Ludwig Hirsch as Theo Pichler
 Franz-Xaver Kroetz as Wendelin
 Lisi Mangold as Eva
 Werner Asam as Gastwirtssohn
 Beatrice Richter as Striptease-Tänzerin
 Oswald as Max
 Uli Steigberg as Willi
 Walter Feuchtenberg as Drucker
 Gundy Grand as Patra
 Billy Griffin as Neger
 Sieglinde Hölzle as Politesse

References

External links
 

1981 films
1981 drama films
Austrian drama films
West German films
German drama films
1980s German-language films
Films directed by Klaus Emmerich
1980s German films